Eric Sedler is a founder and Chief Executive Officer of Kivvit, a public affairs and communications firm with offices in Chicago, Miami, New Jersey, New York and Washington D.C. Kivvit provides communications planning, message development, digital, advertising, media relations and content production services to major companies, industry associations, non-profits, government agencies and advocacy organizations.

Sedler co-founded Kivvit with former White House Senior Advisor David Axelrod. At Kivvit, Sedler has worked on a variety of high-profile projects with clients in major industries including telecommunications, energy, financial services, health care, entertainment and land use.  However, before entering the communications management field, Sedler spent nearly a decade working in the political and governmental world.

Early life

Sedler was born in 1968 and grew up in suburban Detroit, Michigan. He graduated from the University of Illinois at Chicago.

His father, Robert Sedler, is a retired distinguished law professor at Wayne State University Law School, in Detroit, Michigan, where he taught courses like Constitutional Law and Conflict of Laws. His mother, Rozanne Sedler, was a long-time social worker at Jewish Family Service. She has long been an advocate for the rights and needs of the elderly at the local, state and federal levels, and she has given legislative testimony on the conditions in nursing homes.

Early career
Prior to co-founding Kivvit, Sedler was an executive at AT&T where he managed public relations offices in Chicago, Atlanta and Miami covering a fourteen-state region in the central and southeastern United States. Earlier employment experience included time at Edelman Public Relations working in the Reputation Management practice, where he directed media and public affairs campaigns. Before entering the field of public affairs, Sedler spent nearly a decade working in politics and government, including working for Illinois House Speaker Michael Madigan.

ASGK Public Strategies
In 2002, Sedler left AT&T to join political strategist David Axelrod in creating ASGK Public Strategies .

In 2009, Axelrod sold his share of the firm to Kupper and Sedler for $1 million as he prepared to join the Obama Administration’s senior staff.

Kivvit
In 2015, ASGK Public Strategies and its subsidiary, M Public Affairs, merged to create Kivvit.

Awards
In 2015, Sedler was named one of “The 20 Most Powerful Political Insiders” and a “Who’s Who in Chicago Business” by Crain’s Chicago Business. He is also the recipient of the Silver Anvil Award from the Public Relations Society of America and the Silver Trumpet Award from the Publicity Club of Chicago.

Prominent Campaigns
In 2009, Sedler and his firm were tapped to work for Chicago’s 2016 Olympic Bid. In 2014, ASGK Public Strategies coordinated a campaign to bring marriage equality to Illinois. ASGK also worked closely with University of Chicago in 2015 to bring the Barack Obama Presidential Center to a site near the Hyde Park campus.

Notable Clients
Some of Kivvit’s current and former clients include:

 Allstate
 AT&T
 BMOHarris
 Cablevision
 Choose Chicago
 Citadel
 Citigroup
 CME Group
 Comcast
 ComEd
 Chicago Cubs
 Google
 HMSHost
 National Cable and Telecommunications Association
 UI Labs
 United States Olympic Committee
 University of Chicago
 Xerox

Personal life
Sedler currently resides in Chicago’s West Loop neighborhood with his wife Marla Sedler and their two children.  Marla is the vice-president of Friends of Skinner West, a group that supports Chicago Public School Skinner West through volunteerism and fundraising.

References

External links
 ASGK Public Strategies
 West Loop Community Organization
 Eric Sedler

Living people
American businesspeople
Year of birth missing (living people)